The 1946 All-Ireland Minor Football Championship was the 15th staging of the All-Ireland Minor Football Championship, the Gaelic Athletic Association's premier inter-county Gaelic football tournament for boys under the age of 18.

Dublin entered the championship as defending champions.

On 6 October 1946, Kerry won the championship following a 3-7 to 2-3 defeat of Dublin in the All-Ireland final. This was their fourth All-Ireland title and their first in ten championship seasons.

Results

Connacht Minor Football Championship

Munster Minor Football Championship

Leinster Minor Football Championship

Ulster Minor Football Championship

All-Ireland Minor Football Championship
Semi-Finals

Final

Championship statistics

Miscellaneous

 The All-Ireland final was originally scheduled for 22 September 1946, but was delayed for two weeks as part of the "Save the Harvest" campaign.

References

1946
All-Ireland Minor Football Championship